Man Myanmar Plaza (also known as Man Myanmar Zegyo Plaza (မန်း မြန်မာ ဈေးချို ပလာဇာ)) is a mixed use complex in Mandalay, Myanmar. The complex consists of a  six-story shopping center, and two 25-story condominium buildings. From 2014 to until the completion of Grand Park Hotel, Mandalay in 2019, the twin condo towers were the tallest buildings in Mandalay, as well as the tallest buildings outside of Yangon.

The fifth floor of the plaza suffered a fire in 2018.

References

Buildings and structures in Mandalay